Toonbox is a Cyprus animation studio located in Paphos.

History 

The studio was founded in 2008, by Pavel Muntyan (CEO) and Vladimir Ponomarev (CCO).

Starting from 2011, Toonbox representatives got actively involved in the development of animated cinematograph, including the niche of attracting investments to the industry.

In 2012, Toonbox has openly claimed its involvement in the production of Mr. Freeman animated series on a TV-channel  belonging to Sergey Minaev.

Starting from 2013, the studio has been focusing mainly on animated series for kids.

Since 2014, Toonbox leaders have been urging against anti-advertisement policy in animated cinematograph and television for the sake of industry development.

In 2014, a new episode of Mr. Freeman dedicated to a truly acute topic in Russia — bitcoin, has been shown in 130 cities worldwide at a time.

In 2014, the headquarters of the company has moved to Cyprus. The move turned out to be in the spotlight of mass media both in Russia and abroad.

In 2015, the number one street artist Banksy played Mr. Freeman's episode Walking On By  at the opening of his weirdo entertainment park Dismaland.

On October 12, 2016 Rovio Entertainment (creator of Angry Birds) has become an official licensing partner of the brand Kit^n^Kate created by Toonbox.

Up to the present moment (late 2019), Toonbox has produced 357 animated movies with a total time-keeping of 18.5 hours. Toonbox produces English, Russian, and non-dialogue content in Full HD in 2D, CGI, and 360 VR formats. Its flagship series include Kit^n^Kate, Qumi-Qumi, Qumi-Qumi 360 VR, and Mr. Freeman.

Toonbox films and series have dubbings into 27 languages and are being broadcast in 130 countries on both TV-channels and VOD platforms. Toonbox YouTube channels can boast 1,9 billion of views. Its international agents include such major companies as Riki Group, Planet Nemo Animation, Maurizio Distefano Licensing, Dadi Media and Ferly.

Animated Shows

Animated short films 
	The Hero as the Rock, 2010, directed by Alexandr Svirsky
	Word and Words, 2010, directed by Alexandr Svirsky
	The Magic Pot, 2010, directed by Andrey Bahurin
	Onotole, 2010, directed by Dmitry Gorbunov, Artur Merkulov
	Chepurnas, 2012, directed by Alexandr Svirsky

Awards 
 Vinnician Festival, 2008, for the animated movie The Real Adventures of Belka and Strelka 
 Russian Flash Awards', 2009, for the animated movie Three Acrobat Brothers (Best Animation) 
 Open Russian Festival of Animated Film, 2010, for the animated movie The History Could Have Gone Differently (Best Applied Animation) 
 On April 15, 2010 Mr. Freeman was awarded as the best video blog at the international Weblog competition The Best of Blogs in Berlin
 VI Multimatograph, 2010, for the series Shaman's Quest (Grand Prix of the festival) 
 Open Russian Festival of Animated Film, 2012, for the animated movie The Berry Pie (Best Kids' Movie) 
 X Moscow Festival of Native Movies, 2012, for the movie The Berry Pie (Audience Award) 
 XXIV Animation Festival in Suzdal, 2019, for Qumi-Qumi series in an updated format (2D and 3D)

Links 
 Toonbox Studio, official site
 Mr. Freeman, official site
 Qumi-Qumi, official site
 Shaman's Quest, official site
 Kit^n^Kate, official site

References 

Russian companies established in 2008
Mass media companies established in 2008
Mass media companies of Cyprus
Russian animation studios
Paphos